Arnold & Porter Kaye Scholer LLP is an American multinational law firm. A white-shoe firm, Arnold & Porter is among the largest law firms in the world, by both revenue and by its number of lawyers.

History
Arnold & Porter was founded in 1946 by New Deal veterans Thurman Arnold, a former Yale Law School professor and U.S. Court of Appeals Judge on the D.C. Circuit, and Abe Fortas, another former Yale Law School professor who later became a Supreme Court Justice. In 1947, Paul A. Porter, a former Chairman of the Federal Communications Commission joined the firm and it was renamed Arnold, Fortas & Porter.  In 1965, Abe Fortas' name was dropped from the firm's moniker after his ascension to the Supreme Court.

In November 2016, Arnold & Porter announced that it would be merging with New York-based firm Kaye Scholer to form Arnold & Porter Kaye Scholer LLP, with approximately 1000 attorneys across ten domestic and four international offices. The merger took effect on January 1, 2017.  In February 2018, The National Law Journal reported that the newly combined "firm has quietly reversed its post-merger branding efforts" and "scrubbed nearly all mention of 'Kaye Scholer' from its public image, changing its brand name, email addresses and web domain", while retaining the legal entity name in full. In September 2020, Arnold & Porter announced that they will shut down their Frankfurt office by the end of March 2021. 

In 2022, Arnold & Porter was a founding member of the Legal Alliance for Reproductive Rights, a coalition of United States law firms offering free legal services to people seeking and providing abortions in the wake of Dobbs v. Jackson Women's Health Organization, which overruled Roe v. Wade.

Clients 
Arnold & Porter served as counsel to Clarence Earl Gideon in the landmark case of Gideon v. Wainwright, subject of the Edgar Award-winning book Gideon's Trumpet by Anthony Lewis. The firm also represented the survivors of the Buffalo Creek Flood, which was the subject of the book Buffalo Creek Disaster, by Gerald M. Stern (required reading in many law schools). Arnold & Porter was the only BigLaw firm to represent the victims of Joseph McCarthy, and the "loyalty review boards". All three founders of the firm were so disturbed by the use of secret evidence that, at one point, the firm's lawyers were spending half of their time fighting these cases.

Arnold & Porter successfully defended Random House from a claim of copyright infringement against The Da Vinci Code, written by Dan Brown. The firm also served as outside counsel to the Independent Review Committee during its examination of Smithsonian Institution Secretary Lawrence Small's management. The firm was also counsel to Philip Morris for its mass tort litigation of the 1990s; WorldCom executive Scott Sullivan; Martha Stewart; and CBS, in its litigation against Howard Stern.

The firm successfully represented the government of Venezuela in its case against the United States' Clean Air Act, on the grounds that the CAA violated World Trade Organization agreements.

Arnold & Porter represented US Airways in its merger with America West. Arnold & Porter also assisted SBC Communications Inc. in its acquisition of AT&T Corp., forming the new AT&T Inc.

It is also defending the South Korean government in its case against Lone Star Funds. The Korean law firm  법무법인(유한) 태평양(Bae, Kim & Lee LLC) is working with Arnold &Porter on the case.

Pro bono work 
In 2020, Arnold & Porter attorneys helped secure a $14 million judgment for 12 Black Lives Matter protesters who were victims of police brutality in Colorado. The matter took 18-months to settle and required 14,000-plus lawyer hours.

Attorneys with the firm assisted the family of Lt. Henry Ossian Flipper in obtaining the first posthumous Presidential pardon in U.S. history, and representation of Ukrainian mail order bride Nataliya Fox against international marriage broker Encounters International in a landmark case that helped to establish the rights of such women. 

The firm is co-counsel with the DC Prisoners' Project of the Washington Lawyers' Committee for Civil Rights and Urban Affairs, which represents prisoners at ADX Florence who allege deficiencies in psychiatric evaluation and care in Cunningham v. Federal Bureau of Prisons.

Offices

   Amsterdam, the Netherlands
   Brussels, Belgium
   Chicago, Illinois
   Denver, Colorado
   London, United Kingdom
   Los Angeles, California
   Houston, Texas
   Newark, New Jersey
   New York, New York
   Palo Alto, California
   San Francisco, California
   Seoul, South Korea
   Shanghai, China
   Washington, D.C.

Notable alumni

Clifford Alexander - U.S. Secretary of the Army, chairman of the Equal Employment Opportunity Commission, and presidential advisor
Thurman Arnold, founder — U.S. Court of Appeals Judge for the D.C. Circuit, Yale Law School Professor
William Baer — United States Department of Justice Assistant Attorney General, Antitrust Division
Eli Whitney Debevoise II — U.S. Executive Director of the World Bank
Chris Dodd — former Democratic Senator, Connecticut
Brooksley Born — Chairwoman, U.S. Commodity Futures Trading Commission
Joseph A. Califano — U.S. Secretary of Health, Education, and Welfare, Chairman of the National Center of Addiction and Substance Abuse
Pamela Ki Mai Chen — United States District Judge of the United States District Court for the Eastern District of New York.
Mary DeRosa — former Deputy Counsel to the President for National Security Affairs in the Obama Administration
Allison H. Eid — Judge of the United States Court of Appeals for the Tenth Circuit
John Hart Ely — legal scholar and former dean of Stanford Law School
Abe Fortas, founder — Supreme Court Justice, Yale Law School professor
Merrick Garland — Attorney General of the United States, former U.S. Court of Appeals Chief Judge for the D.C. Circuit, 2016 nominee to the Supreme Court to replace Antonin Scalia
Michael Gerrard — Columbia Law School professor, former partner in charge of the firm's New York City office
Charles Halpern — Founder of the Center for Law and Social Policy, first Dean of City University of New York School of Law, Berkeley School of Law professor
 Kenneth I. Juster — Under Secretary of Commerce for Export Administration
Irvin B. Nathan — Attorney General of the District of Columbia, General Counsel of the United States House of Representatives
Matthew G. Olsen — Director of the National Counterterrorism Center and former General Counsel of the National Security Agency
Paul A. Porter, founder — Chairman of the Federal Communications Commission
Margaret M. Morrow — United States District Judge of the United States District Court for the Central District of California
Sarah Bloom Raskin — member of the Board of Governors of the Federal Reserve System
Charles A. Reich — legal and social scholar
William D. Rogers — President, American Society of International Law, Undersecretary of State for Economic Affairs, Assistant Secretary of State for Inter-American Affairs
Jonathan Schiller — co-founder and managing partner, Boies Schiller Flexner LLP
Jack Quinn — former Clinton White House counsel and founder of Quinn Gillespie & Associates

References

External links
Arnold & Porter Website

 
Law firms based in Washington, D.C.
Law firms established in 1946
1946 establishments in Washington, D.C.